Twelvemile Creek is a  tributary of the Mustinka River of Minnesota in the United States. It rises in Stevens County and flows northwest before joining the Mustinka in Traverse County. Via the Mustinka and Bois de Sioux rivers, the Red River of the North, Lake Winnipeg, and the Nelson River, it is part of the Hudson Bay watershed.

See also
List of rivers of Minnesota

References

Minnesota Watersheds

USGS Hydrologic Unit Map - State of Minnesota (1974)

Rivers of Minnesota
Tributaries of Hudson Bay
Rivers of Stevens County, Minnesota
Rivers of Traverse County, Minnesota